The 2012 Beijing International Challenger was a professional tennis tournament played on hard courts. It was the third edition of the tournament which was part of the 2012 ATP Challenger Tour and the 2012 ITF Women's Circuit. It took place in Beijing, China between 28 July and 5 August 2012.

ATP singles main-draw entrants

Seeds

 1 Rankings are as of July 23, 2012.

Other entrants
The following players received wildcards into the singles main draw:
  Chang Yu
  Gong Maoxin
  Ma Ya-Nan
  Ouyang Bowen

The following players received entry from the qualifying draw:
  Yuuya Kibi
  Lim Yong-kyu
  Toshihide Matsui
  Nikolaus Moser

WTA entrants

Seeds

 1 Rankings are as of July 23, 2012.

Other entrants
The following players received wildcards into the singles main draw:
  Li Ting
  Wang Yafan
  Yang Zhaoxuan

The following players received entry from the qualifying draw:
  Ksenia Lykina
  Tang Hao Chen
  Wen Xin
  Zhou Yimiao

The following player received entry from A Lucky loser spot:
  Liang Chen

Champions

Men's singles

 Grega Žemlja def.  Wu Di, 6–3, 6–0

Women's singles

 Wang Qiang  def.  Chan Yung-jan, 6–2, 6–4

Men's doubles

 Sanchai Ratiwatana /  Sonchat Ratiwatana def.  Yuki Bhambri /  Divij Sharan, 7–6(7–3), 2–6, [10–6]

Women's doubles

 Liu Wanting /  Sun Shengnan def.  Chan Chin-wei /  Han Xinyun, 5–7, 6–0, [10–7]

References

External links
Official website

Beijing International Challenger
Beijing International Challenger
Beijing International Challenger